The name Isidore has been used for four tropical cyclones in the Atlantic Ocean.

 Tropical Storm Isidore (1984) - made landfall at Andros Island in the Bahamas and then crossed central Florida, causing USD$750,000 in damage.
 Hurricane Isidore (1990) - Category 2 hurricane that remained over the open ocean.
 Hurricane Isidore (1996) - Category 3 that never made landfall.
 Hurricane Isidore (2002) - Category 3 hurricane that struck western Cuba and the Yucatán causing $330 million in damage and seven deaths.

Isidore was retired after the 2002 hurricane season and replaced with Ike for the 2008 season.

Atlantic hurricane set index articles